The Best of the Radiators: Songs from the Ancient Furnace is the second compilation album from The Radiators, released by Epic Records in 1997.

Overview

The album features excerpts from the band's three studio albums with Epic Records, as well as seven previously unreleased tracks, including a live version of "Love is a Tangle".

Track listing

 "Nail Your Heart to Mine" (Ed Volker)
 "Like Dreamers Do" (Volker)
 "Confidential" (Volker)
 "Little Paradise" (Volker)
 "Zigzagging Through Ghostland" (Volker)
 "Doctor Doctor" (Volker, Dave Malone, Camile Baudoin, Reggie Scanlan, Frank Bua Jr., Glenn Sears)
 "My Whole World Flies Apart"
 "Join the Circus"
 "Let the Red Wine Flow" (Volker, Malone, Baudoin)
 "Fluid Drive"
 "End of Your Rope"
 "Molasses" (Volker, Malone)
 "Moving Day"
 "Love Is a Tangle"

Credits
 Ed Volker – keyboards, vocals, percussion
 Dave Malone – guitars, vocals
 Camile Baudoin – guitars, vocals
 Reggie Scanlan – bass
 Frank Bua Jr. – drums
 Glenn Sears – percussion

The Radiators (American band) albums
1997 greatest hits albums
Epic Records compilation albums